The Gross Lichterfelde Tramway was the world's first commercially successful electric tram and first public electric tramway used for permanent service. It was built by the Siemens & Halske company in Lichterfelde, a suburb of Berlin, and went in service on 16 May 1881.

Overview
Werner von Siemens had presented the first electric passenger train at the Berlin industrial exhibition two years before. In order to develop the concept, he received the official approval to run an electric tramway line on already existing tracks, which had been used for building the Prussian military academy (Hauptkadettenanstalt) at Lichterfelde West.

The  line started at Berlin-Lichterfelde Ost station on the Anhalt Railway line. Each car was originally equipped with a 180-volt DC  traction motor, the current being supplied via the running rails, in a manner similar to that used by most present-day model railways. Therefore, the  tracks were generally separated from roads, and trespassing was prohibited. 

At level crossings, the rails were dead or switched on only briefly before the approach of the tramcar. Nevertheless, people and horses frequently received electric shocks. It is also believed that, in order to enjoy the sight of glowing metal, young people caused short circuits by putting wire mesh on the tracks, which shut down the operation. 

In 1891, the tramway was equipped with an overhead wire, and the line was extended to Berlin-Lichterfelde West station. There were several further extensions, but operation was discontinued in 1931.

See also
Trams in Berlin
Elektromote

References 
railserve.com, The First in Railroads and Trains
The Railway News, Volume 56, Oct. 10, 1891, page 578
engagetechnology.com, History of transportation
germaniatours.net Germany

Tram transport in Germany
History of rail transport in Germany
Rail transport in Berlin
Steglitz-Zehlendorf
Metre gauge railways in Germany
1881 in transport
1881 in Germany